Miss World 1961, the 11th edition of the Miss World pageant, was held on 9 November 1961 at the Lyceum Ballroom in London, United Kingdom. The winner was Rosemarie Frankland of United Kingdom. She was crowned by Bob Hope. Frankland also was a first runner-up at Miss Universe 1961, representing Wales.

Results

Contestants

  – Susana Julia Pardal
  – Hella Wolfsgrubej
  – Jacqueline Oroi
  – Nancy Cortez Justiniano
  – Alda Maria Coutinho de Moraes
  – Sushila Perera
  – Andreava Polydorou
  – Inge Jörgensen
  – Magdalena Dávila Varela
  – Ritva Tuulikki Wächter
  – Michèle Wargnier
  – Romy März
  – Efstathia Karaiskaki
  – Ria van Zuiden
  – Jóhanna Kolbrún Kristjánsdóttir
  – Veronica Leonora Torcato
  – Olive Ursula White
  – Er'ela Hod
  – Franca Cattaneo
  – Chie Murakami
  – Hyun Chang-ae
  – Leila Antaki
  – Vicky Schoos
  – Jeanne Rakatomahanina
  – Leone Mary Main
  – Thelma Arana
  – Angela Joyce Moorcroft
  – Yvonne Brenda Hulley
  – María del Carmen Cervera Fernández
  – Kitty Essed
  – Ingrid Margareta Lundquist
  – Grace Li Shiu-Ying
  – Güler Samuray
  – Rosemarie Frankland †
  – Roma Spadachinni Aguerre
  – Jo Ann Odum
  – Bexy Romero Tosta

Notes

Debuts
 China and Suriname competed in Miss World for the first time.

Returning countries
 Ceylon last competed in 1955.
 New Zealand last competed in 1956.
 Venezuela last competed in 1958.
 Austria last competed in 1959.

References

External links
 Miss World official website
 Pageantopolis – Miss World 1961

Miss World
1961 in London
1961 beauty pageants
Beauty pageants in the United Kingdom
November 1961 events in the United Kingdom